Two Japanese destroyers have been named :

 , the lead ship of the  commissioned in 1916 and sold in 1940
 , a  launched in March 1944 and sunk in December 1944

See also 
  of the Imperial Japanese Navy
 Momo (disambiguation)

Imperial Japanese Navy ship names
Japanese Navy ship names